Robert E. Lewis (April 3, 1857 – July 31, 1941) was a United States circuit judge of the United States Court of Appeals for the Eighth Circuit and the United States Court of Appeals for the Tenth Circuit and previously was a United States district judge of the United States District Court for the District of Colorado.

Education and career

Born in Cass County, Missouri, Lewis studied at Westminster College in Fulton, Missouri. Afterward, he read law to enter the bar in 1880. Lewis was then in private practice in Clinton, Missouri from 1880 to 1897, and as worked as a prosecuting attorney of Henry County, Missouri from 1883 to 1887. He was also a Republican candidate for Governor of Missouri in 1896 and a Judge of the 4th Judicial District of Colorado from 1903 to 1906.

Federal judicial service

Lewis was nominated by President Theodore Roosevelt on April 9, 1906, to a seat on the United States District Court for the District of Colorado vacated by Judge Moses Hallett. He was confirmed by the United States Senate on April 10, 1906, and received his commission the same day. His service terminated on December 1, 1921, due to his elevation to the Eighth Circuit.

Lewis was nominated by President Warren G. Harding on November 3, 1921, to a seat on the United States Court of Appeals for the Eighth Circuit vacated by Judge William Cather Hook. He was confirmed by the Senate on November 15, 1921, and received his commission the same day. Lewis was reassigned by operation of law to the United States Court of Appeals for the Tenth Circuit on March 28, 1929, to a new seat authorized by 45 Stat. 1346. He was a member of the Conference of Senior Circuit Judges (now the Judicial Conference of the United States) from 1929 to 1940. He assumed senior status on May 31, 1940. He was the last appeals court judge who continued to serve in active service appointed by President Harding. His service ended on July 31, 1941, with his death.

References

1857 births
1941 deaths
Colorado state court judges
Westminster College (Missouri) alumni
Judges of the United States District Court for the District of Colorado
Judges of the United States Court of Appeals for the Eighth Circuit
Judges of the United States Court of Appeals for the Tenth Circuit
United States district court judges appointed by Theodore Roosevelt
20th-century American judges
United States court of appeals judges appointed by Warren G. Harding
United States federal judges admitted to the practice of law by reading law
People from Cass County, Missouri
People from Clinton, Missouri